Utricularia alpina is a medium-sized terrestrial or epiphytic, perennial carnivorous plant that belongs to the genus Utricularia. U. alpina is native to the Antilles and northern South America, where it is found in Brazil, Colombia, Guyana, and Venezuela. In the Antilles it can be found in Dominica, Grenada, Guadeloupe, Jamaica, Martinique, Montserrat, Saba, Saint Kitts, Saint Lucia, Saint Vincent, and Trinidad.

See also 
 List of Utricularia species

References 

Carnivorous plants of South America
Flora of Brazil
Flora of Colombia
Flora of Dominica
Flora of Guadeloupe
Flora of Guyana
Flora of Jamaica
Flora of Martinique
Flora of Trinidad and Tobago
Flora of Venezuela
alpina
Plants described in 1760
Taxa named by Nikolaus Joseph von Jacquin
Flora without expected TNC conservation status